The Maudslay Motor Company was a British vehicle maker based in Coventry.  It was founded in 1902 and continued until 1948 when it was  taken over by the Associated Equipment Company (AEC) and along with Crossley Motors the new group was renamed Associated Commercial Vehicles (ACV) Ltd.

Early history

The company was founded by Cyril Charles Maudslay, great grandson of the eminent engineer Henry Maudslay to make marine internal combustion engines. He was joined by his cousin Reginald Walter Maudslay who soon left to found the Standard Motor Company.

The engines did not sell very well, and in 1902 they made their first engine intended for a car which was fitted to chain-drive chassis. The three-cylinder engine, designed by Alexander Craig, was an advanced unit with a single overhead camshaft and pressure lubrication. In 1902, Maudslay Motors made a petrol railway locomotive for City of London Corporation to draw trucks from the London, Brighton and South Coast Railway to the Corporation meat market at Deptford, this requiring 50 tons to be drawn up a gradient of 1 in 36. It was fitted with a three-cylinder engine developing 85 bhp at 450 rpm, with cylinders of 9inch bore and stroke. Transmission was via a 2-speed change gear. The locomotive weighed 12 tons, and was provided with an 8 hp auxiliary engine which was used to start the main engine. This was the first commercially successful petrol locomotive in the world.

The three-cylinder engine was followed in 1903 by a six-cylinder version, possibly the first overhead-camshaft six to go into production.  For 1904 a range of cars was on offer, including one with a 9.6-litre version of the six-cylinder engine.  The cars were among the most expensive on the British market.

As well as cars the company made commercial vehicles with the first double decker bus produced in 1905 and a range of trucks varying from small two-cylinder models to six ton models. In 1912 Maudslay supplied a  engine to power an early petrol-electric railcar.

A side-valve engine was introduced in 1914.

World War I

Private car production stopped with the outbreak of war. Five- and six-ton lorries had been supplied to the British War Office in 1913, and these, along with a three-ton model, became the main product during hostilities. In addition, aircraft undercarriages were made, as well as reconditioning work carried out on radial engines. Production of complete engines was started in 1918.

Inter-War Years

Despite the advent of peace in 1918, private car building was not resumed, apart from a solitary example of an advanced sports car, shown at the 1923 London Motor Show. Heavy goods vehicles were the main line and some were modified for passenger carrying.

A breakthrough came in 1924, when a low-level coach chassis was introduced.

A significant product was the SF40 front-engined coach chassis, with set-back front axle, which came onto the market in 1934. It achieved quite successful sales figures until the advent of World War II.

World War II and after
All civilian vehicle production stopped in 1939, and the company turned out general service vehicles, tank and aircraft components.  In 1941, virtually all production was transferred to a new works at Great Alne, near Alcester to escape air raids.

However, some production remained in Coventry, and when the factory was bombed in the Coventry Blitz several people were killed there.

The Great Alne works would be known as Castle Maudslay. Automotive production remained at this site for many years. During the 1990s brakes and axles for automotive manufactures like Volvo and Renault heavy vehicles were produced there, and ArvinMeritor, the company that once owned the Castle Maudslay site, maintained a small office and manufacturing facility there until the site was eventually demolished and is due to become 'Maudslay Park', a housing development (correct at 2014).

A completely new range of heavy vehicles with 4, 6 and 8 wheel chassis as well as luxury coaches was introduced. Castle Maudslay at Alcester would make components, and these would be taken to the Parkside, Coventry works for vehicle assembly.

Merger

In 1948, Maudslay joined AEC and Crossley in the new Associated Commercial Vehicles (ACV) Ltd.  The name was kept on at first, but in 1950 it was phased out. The Maudslay plants continued to assemble AEC-designed models in the 1950s and there were some badge-engineered Maudslays to give AEC extra space at Motor Shows. After the formation of Leyland Motor Corporation the Castle Maudlsay plant produced axles; Rockwell bought it in the late 1970s.

In 1942, three of Henry Maudslay's grandsons commemorated their grandfather's name by forming the Maudslay Society, an organisation to encourage young engineers.

See also 
 List of car manufacturers of the United Kingdom

References

External links

Defunct motor vehicle manufacturers of England
Defunct bus manufacturers of the United Kingdom
Defunct truck manufacturers of the United Kingdom
Coventry motor companies